Know What I Mean? is a 1962 album by jazz musician Julian "Cannonball" Adderley, accompanied by Bill Evans and the rhythm section of the Modern Jazz Quartet. It was released on Riverside label as RLP-433.

Barely noticeable on the album cover is a small picture of Bill Evans, directly underneath the sculpture (from Bertha Schaefer Gallery) to Adderley's right.

Reception
The AllMusic review by Rick Anderson awarded the album 4 stars and states: "It's hard to imagine any fan of mainstream jazz not finding much to love on this very fine recording". The Penguin Guide to Jazz awarded the album 3 stars out of 4, stating: "'The quartet date with Bill Evans was one of the last chances to hear him as sole horn, and he sounds fine".

Track listing
"Waltz for Debby" (Bill Evans, Gene Lees) – 5:15
"Goodbye" (Gordon Jenkins) – 6:15
"Who Cares?" (Take 5) (George Gershwin, Ira Gershwin) – 5:57
"Venice" (John Lewis) – 2:55
"Toy" (Clifford Jordan) – 5:09
"Elsa" (Earl Zindars) – 5:52
"Nancy (With the Laughing Face)" (Phil Silvers, Jimmy Van Heusen) – 4:08
"Know What I Mean?" (Re-take 7) (Evans) – 4:54
"Who Cares?" (Take 4) – 5:55
"Know What I Mean?" (Take 12) – 7:01

Tracks 2-3, 7, 9-10 recorded on January 27, 1961; tracks 5 & 6 on February 21; tracks 1, 4 & 8 recorded on March 13, 1961, all at Bell Sound Studios, New York City.

Personnel
Cannonball Adderley - alto saxophone
Bill Evans - piano
Percy Heath - acoustic bass
Connie Kay - drums

Production staff
Bill Stoddard - Recording Engineer
Ken Deardoff - album design

References

1962 albums
Bill Evans albums
Cannonball Adderley albums
Albums produced by Orrin Keepnews
Riverside Records albums
Original Jazz Classics albums